= Volker Lang =

Volker Lang is the name of among others the following Germans

- a leather designer from Aachen and his company
- an artist from Hamburg
